The supraesophageal ganglion (also "supraoesophageal ganglion", "arthropod brain" or "microbrain") is the first part of the arthropod, especially insect, central nervous system. It receives and processes information from the first, second, and third metameres. The supraesophageal ganglion lies dorsal to the esophagus and consists of three parts, each a pair of ganglia that may be more or less pronounced, reduced, or fused depending on the genus:

 The protocerebrum, associated with the eyes (compound eyes and ocelli). Directly associated with the eyes is the optic lobe, as the visual center of the brain.
 The deutocerebrum processes sensory information from the antennae. It consists of two parts, the antennal lobe and the dorsal lobe. The dorsal lobe also contains motor neurons which control the antennal muscles. 
 The tritocerebrum integrates sensory inputs from the previous two pairs of ganglia. The lobes of the tritocerebrum split to circumvent the esophagus and begin the subesophageal ganglion.

The subesophageal ganglion continues the nervous system and lies ventral to the esophagus. Finally, the segmental ganglia of the ventral nerve cord are found in each body segment as a fused ganglion; they provide the segments with some autonomous control.

A locust brain dissection to expose the central brain and carry out electro-physiology recordings can be seen here.

See also
Lateral horn of insect brain
Mushroom bodies
Virtual Fly Brain
Drosophila connectome

References

Further reading
 
 
 

 

Chaudonneret, J. "Evolution of the insect brain with special reference to the so-called tritocerebrum." Arthropod brain. Wiley, New York (1987): 3-26.

External links

Insect anatomy
Fish anatomy
Invertebrate nervous system